Smyrneika Ke Laika (Greek: Σμυρναίικα και λαϊκά) is the name of a studio album by popular Greek singer Tolis Voskopoulos. It was released in March, 1976 by Minos EMI in Greece.

Track listing 

Side One.
 "Ah, Vaggelitsa mou" feat. Marinella - (Tolis Voskopoulos-Mimis Theiopoulos) - 2:43 - (Greek: Αχ, Βαγγελίτσα μου)
 "Prin chathi to oniro mas" feat. Marinella - (Tolis Voskopoulos-Mimis Theiopoulos) - 3:18 - (Greek: Πριν χαθεί το όνειρό μας)
 "Den tha kimithis" feat. Marinella - (Tolis Voskopoulos-Mimis Theiopoulos) - 2:45 - (Greek: Δεν θα κοιμηθείς)
 "Pexe file to santouri" feat. Marinella - (Tolis Voskopoulos-Mimis Theiopoulos) - 3:08 - (Greek: Παίξε φίλε το σαντούρι)
 "Na 'tane leei macharayas" feat. Marinella - (Tolis Voskopoulos-Mimis Theiopoulos) - 2:26 - (Greek: Να 'τανε λέει μαχαραγιάς)
 "O chamatzis" - (Tolis Voskopoulos-Mimis Theiopoulos) - 2:41 - (Greek: Ο χαματζής)
Side Two.
 "O arabatzis" feat. Marinella - (Vasilis Vasiliadis-Takis Kolettis) - 3:24 - (Greek: Ο αραμπατζής)
 "To varichimono" feat. Marinella - (Vasilis Vasiliadis-Takis Kolettis) - 3:39 - (Greek: Το βαρυχείμωνο)
 "Ainte yia dio matia" feat. Marinella - (Vasilis Vasiliadis-Takis Kolettis) - 3:05 - (Greek: Άιντε για δυο μάτια)
 "Ta maryiolika sou matia" - (Vasilis Vasiliadis-Takis Kolettis) - 3:07 - (Greek: Τα μαργιόλικα σου μάτια)
 "Ston kafene kathomouna" - (Vasilis Vasiliadis-Takis Kolettis) - 2:49 - (Greek: Στον καφενέ καθόμουνα)
 "Na 'tan i agkalia sou fylaki" feat. Marinella - (Vasilis Vasiliadis-Takis Kolettis) - 3:08 - (Greek: Να 'ταν η αγκαλιά σου φυλακή)

Personnel 
 Tolis Voskopoulos - vocals
 Marinella - background vocals
 Achilleas Theofilou - producer

References

1976 albums
Tolis Voskopoulos albums
Greek-language albums
Minos EMI albums